Sankt Jakob in Haus is a municipality in the Kitzbühel district in the Austrian state of Tyrol located 13.60 km northeast of Kitzbühel as well as 2.50 km above Fieberbrunn. It is the smallest community in the district. The village was mentioned in documents for the first time in 1308 but settlement already began in the 10th century. The main source of income is tourism.

Population

References

External links 

 www.riskommunal.net/stjakob – city website

Cities and towns in Kitzbühel District